Dimitris Legkikas (alternate spellings:Sari) (born April 14, 1995) is a Greek professional basketball player who last played for Charilaos Trikoupis of the Greek A2 Basket League. He is a 2.08 m (6 ft 10 in) tall Power forward.

Professional career
Legkikas started his professional career with Ilysiakos in 2014. The following season, he played with Filathlitikos of the Greek B Basket League. After two really good seasons with Filathlitikos, Legikas joined Lavrio of the Greek Basket League. On August 3, 2021, Legkikas moved to Charilaos Trikoupis.

References

External links
Eurobasket.com profile

1995 births
Living people
Charilaos Trikoupis B.C. players
Greek Basket League players
Greek men's basketball players
Lavrio B.C. players
Basketball players from Athens
Power forwards (basketball)